St. John's Arena is a 4,200-seat multipurpose arena located in Steubenville, Ohio (USA). It is used for indoor soccer, basketball, boxing, professional wrestling, wrestling, and other sports, plus conventions, trade shows, and concerts.

About
St. John Arena was built as the Diocesan Community Arena by the Diocese of Steubenville, and was completed in 1960. Among the musical acts that appeared at the arena in its early days were Johnny Mathis, The Supremes, Bobby Rydell, Bobby Vinton and Chubby Checker, along with several popular big bands. It is not known whether Steubenville's most famous native son, Dean Martin, ever appeared in concert at the arena.

When used for concerts, the arena can seat up to 5,400, and as a basketball arena it seats 5,200. The Steubenville O.H. St. John's Arena is now used as a YMCA Wellness Center. 

The Ohio Junior High wrestling championships were held at the arena.

References

Basketball venues in Ohio
Boxing venues in the United States
Convention centers in Ohio
Indoor arenas in Ohio
Indoor soccer venues in Ohio
Sports venues in Ohio
Wrestling venues in Ohio
Steubenville, Ohio
Buildings and structures in Jefferson County, Ohio
Tourist attractions in Jefferson County, Ohio